Noddy may refer to:

People
 Noddy, nickname of Australian rugby league player Brett Kimmorley
 Noddy Holder, English musician and actor, best known as vocalist and guitarist with Slade

Fictional characters
 Noddy (character), a wooden man who lives in Toyland, created by children's author Enid Blyton
 Noddy, nickname of Nicodemus Boffin, from the novel Our Mutual Friend by Charles Dickens

Arts and entertainment
 Noddy (TV series), a children's program 1998–2000
 Noddy (card game), a 16th-century English ancestor of cribbage

Vehicles
 Noddy, a small, usually two-wheeled, one-horse hackney carriage formerly used in Ireland and Scotland
 Noddy bike, nickname for the Velocette LE motorcycles formerly used by the British police
 Noddy (log canoe), listed on the National Register of Historic Places in 1985

Other uses
 Noddy (camera), a camera system use by the BBC 1963–1985
 Noddy (bird), several species of tropical seabirds of the family Sternidae in the genera Anous, Procelsterna, and Gygis
 Noddy, or nod shot, a video production technique used to create the illusion of a seamless dialogue
 Noddy, an application for the Memotech MTX series of microcomputers
 Noddy suit, nickname for a type of NBC suit with a pointed hood used by the British Armed Forces
 NODDY, codename for a British Secret Intelligence Service operation to penetrate the Polish security establishment in the early 1960s
 Noddy (as an adjective) Cumbernauldian in Glaswegian Slang e.g. Noddy Land, Noddy News

See also

 Noddies (disambiguation)
 NOD (disambiguation)